Manon Durand (born 11 February 1998) is a French female canoeist who won three medals at senior level of the Wildwater Canoeing World Championships and European Wildwater Championships.

References

External links
 

1998 births
Living people
French female canoeists
Place of birth missing (living people)